The Chamber of Digital Commerce is an American advocacy group that promotes the emerging industry behind blockchain technology, bitcoin, digital currency and digital assets.

History
Headquartered in Washington, D.C., the organization was founded in July 2014 by Perianne Boring. In October 2014, the chamber received 501(c)(6) non-profit status from the Internal Revenue Service. In 2015,  economist and former JPMorgan Chase executive Blythe Masters was appointed to the advisory board.

In December 2019, former Chairman of the Commodity Futures Trading Commission Christopher Giancarlo was appointed to the advisory board of the chamber.

PAC (political action committee) 
In August 2014, political news site The Hill reported that the Chamber had registered a political action committee with the United States Federal Election Commission. As The Hill piece noted, “formation of the PAC is a sign of increasing maturity for Bitcoin and a signal that politicians could face political pressure to support virtual currencies.” To date, however, the PAC has only raised $10,000 of which only $2,700 has been contributed to a candidate.

References

External links
 

Cryptocurrencies
Trade associations based in the United States
2014 establishments in the United States
Bitcoin companies